Alan Finder (February 19, 1948 – March 24, 2020) was an American journalist. He was a longtime employee of the New York Times. He died during the COVID-19 pandemic from complications brought on by COVID-19.

Early life and education
Alan Aaron Finder was born in Brooklyn and raised in Nassau County, New York, graduating from Valley Stream South High School. He earned a B.A. in history at the University of Rochester in 1969 and an M.A. in American studies at Yale University in 1972.

Career 
From 1974 to 1979, he worked at The Record in Hackensack, New Jersey, and then until 1983 at Newsday on Long Island. Beginning in 1983, Finder worked for 27 years at the New York Times where he was known for his coverage of local news, government, education, urban affairs, sports, international news and politics. He hosted a roundtable on a local New York TV channel, NY1, during which he would talk to other reporters about the current events. He retired in December 2011.

Times executive editor Dean Baquet described Finder as "one of Metro's stars in the 1980s and 1990s, a big writer in a big, hugely competitive era for New York City news". In retirement, he continued to work as an editor for The Record, Newsday, and on the international desk of the New York Times.

Personal life 
He lived in Ridgewood, New Jersey with his wife Elaine. In addition to his wife, Finder left behind a son, Jason Finder, a daughter, Lauren Drucker and a brother, Michael Finder.

Death 
Finder died on March 24, 2020, at The Valley Hospital in Ridgewood, New Jersey. He had recently tested positive for COVID-19.

References

1948 births
2020 deaths
Writers from Brooklyn
The New York Times writers
Deaths from the COVID-19 pandemic in New Jersey
Journalists from New York City
People from Nassau County, New York
University of Rochester alumni
Yale Graduate School of Arts and Sciences alumni
20th-century American journalists
American male journalists
20th-century American male writers
21st-century American journalists
21st-century American male writers
Newsday people
Valley Stream South High School alumni